The 1918 All-Service football team consists of American football players selected to the all-service football teams chosen by various selectors.

All-Service players of 1918

Ends
 Woodruff, Granite State (WC-1)
Clarence Zimmerman, Washington State; Mare Island Marines (WC-1)
Schroeder, Minnesota; Chicago Naval Reserves (WE-1)
Klein, Illinois; Chicago Naval Reserves (WE-1)
George Halas, Illinois; Great Lakes Navy (WC-2)
Statz, Camp Slocum (WC-2)
Jardine, Camp Dodge (WE-2)
Mansfield, Camp Grant (WE-2)
Chambers, Mather Field (WC-3)
Dick Reichle, Illinois; Great Lakes Navy (WC-3)

Tackles
Christian "Big Ben" Bentz, Montana; Chicago Naval Reserves (WC-1, WE-1)
Hugh Blacklock, Michigan Agricultural; Great Lakes Navy (WC-1, WE-1)
Conway, Newport (WC-2)
Andrews, Chicago Naval Reserves (WE-2)
Hankey, Camp Grant (WE-2)
Pud Seidel, Pitt; Camp Greenleaf (WC-3)
Maynard, Bremerton (WC-3)

Guards
Emmett Keefe, Notre Dame; Great Lakes Navy (WC-2 [as t], WE-1)
Jock Sutherland, Pitt; Camp Greenleaf (WC-1)
Johnny Budd, Lafayette; League Island (WC-1)
Jerry Jones, Notre Dame; Great Lakes Navy (WE-1)
Fred Hamilton, Washington State; Mather Field  (WC-2)
Oldham, Armed Guard  (WC-2)
Knute Cauldwell, Wabash; Camp Taylor (WE-2)
Massopust, Camp Dodge (WE-2)
Lynch, Newport  (WC-3)
Thockmorton, Pelham  (WC-3)

Centers
Charlie Bachman, Notre Dame; Great Lakes Navy (WC-1)
Al Feeney, Notre Dame; Camp Taylor (WE-1)
Selph, Camp Lewis (WC-2)
William C. "Dutch" Gorgas, Chicago; Cleveland Naval Reserves  (WE-2)
Jake Risley, Oregon; Mare Island Marines (WC-3)

Quarterbacks
Paddy Driscoll, Northwestern; Great Lakes Navy (WC-1, WE-1)
Gaylord Stinchcomb, Ohio State; Cleveland Naval Reserves (WC-2, WE-2)
Albright, Camp Dix (WC-3)

Halfbacks
Jimmy DeHart, Pitt; Mather Field (WC-1)
George Hoban, Lehigh; Camp Devens (WC-1)
Jerry Johnson, Morningside; Chicago Naval Reserves (WE-1)
Everett Strupper, Georgia Tech; Camp Gordon (WC-2)
Lear, Pelham (WC-2)
Coughlin, Camp Dodge (WE-2)
Hal Erickson, St. Olaf's; Great Lakes Navy (WE-2)
White, Harvard Radio (WC-3)
Howard Berry, Penn; Camp Hancock (WC-3)

Fullbacks
Moon Ducote, Auburn; Cleveland Naval Reserves (WC-2, WE-1 [as hb])
Charlie Brickley, Harvard; Hoboken Trans (WC-1)
Bob Koehler, Northwestern; Chicago Naval Reserves (WE-1)
Hoffman, Cornell; Camp Taylor  (WE-2)
Andy Hillhouse, Brown; Camp Merritt (WC-3)

Key
WC = Walter Camp's All-Service selection.
WE = Walter Eckersall's All-Service selection.

 1 – First-team selection
 2 – Second-team selection
 3 – Third-team selection

References

All-Service Team